Gary Wilson (born 11 August 1985) is an English professional snooker player from Wallsend in North Tyneside, Tyne and Wear.

After showing promise from a young age, Wilson  turned professional in 2004. He dropped off the tour in 2006 however, and did not regain his professional status until 2013. During his time as an amateur, Wilson spent time working as a taxi driver, bar man and in a frozen food factory.

Noted for his cue ball control and break building ability, Wilson has won one ranking title, the 2022 Scottish Open, and has finished as runner up at the 2015 China Open and the 2021 British Open. He also reached the semi-final at the 2019 World Championship as a qualifier.

Career

Early career
Wilson started playing snooker aged three and soon started showing promise. At the age of 8 he had already been put into a team performing in the local league, despite some clubs refusing to allow a child to play. Aged 9, he made his first century, and appeared for the first time at the BBC1's snooker game show series Junior Big Break: Stars of the Future (he would make two more appearances at the show). He played exhibition matches with John Parrott and Willie Thorne, and defeated Jimmy White and Ronnie O'Sullivan in level matches. Wilson went on to win a number of national titles, including the UK Under-18 championship twice, and was widely regarded as one of the most promising junior players in the country.

In 2003, Wilson made his international debut at the European U-19's Championship in Latvia. The same year he started his professional career by playing Challenge Tour, the second-level professional tour at the time, and won the fourth event in 2004 to finish fourth in the rankings and secure his place on the main tour for 2004–05 season. Wilson's biggest achievement that year, however, was the victory at the World Under-21 Snooker Championship in Ireland. Having won all seven of his round robin matches while dropping only two frames, he went all the way to the final, defeating the likes of Pankaj Advani, Aditya Mehta and Liang Wenbo. In the final Wilson saw off Kobkit Palajin with breaks of 142 and 135 to win 11–5.

In his debut season Wilson reached the last 48 of the Irish Masters and last 64 of the China Open. These results were just enough to ensure that he would remain on tour for another year. The next season, Wilson reached the last 64 stage twice, but the rest of his performances were unsuccessful, and following defeat to James Tatton in the World Championship qualifying, he fell off the tour. In 2013 Wilson commented: "At the end of it, when you looked at the rankings it was only by one match and I was gutted. The thing is, at the time, and this is not an excuse, the game was nowhere near as popular as now. It was going through a really bad patch and there were only six tournaments in all compared to now when there are 20–25 tournaments per season. It meant if you had two bad tournaments and you were not doing too well you did not have much time to recover. It is so different now."

Amateur years and return to main tour
Wilson was to spend the next four years attempting to regain his tour place via the PIOS tour, having come close to finishing inside the top 8 on several occasions. He was forced to start working as a taxi driver at the time to make a living.

Following the introduction of the Q School, Wilson again came close to winning a tour card, reaching the fourth round twice in 2011 and once in 2012. He also took part in the 2012 IBSF World Championship in Bulgaria, having finished top of the English amateur rankings. He reached the final but lost 8–10 to Muhammad Asif. During the 2011–12 season Wilson entered a number of PTC events, defeating the likes of Peter Ebdon and Marco Fu, and reaching the last 32 twice. The next season was even better, as he performed consistently and reached the last 16 of Scottish Open; as a result he finished third among the amateur players on the Order of Merit, and finally regained his tour place after seven years. Wilson said, "I knew if I went quite far in that last event I would be able to turn professional off that, so losing the world amateur final did not end my dreams".

2013/2014
Wilson had one of the strongest starts to the season among the new players on tour. In the first tournament, the Wuxi Classic, he defeated James Wattana to qualify for his second ever venue appearance; there he would lose in a deciding frame to David Morris.
After failing to qualify for both the Australian Open and the Shanghai Masters, Wilson had his best result to date at the inaugural Indian Open, defeating Jimmy White, Dominic Dale and Marco Fu on the way to the last 16, where he lost again in the deciding frame, this time to Michael White. Following his first round defeat at the International Championship to Wattana, Wilson went on to reach the last 32 of both the UK Championship and the German Masters. During the qualifying match for the latter tournament against Ricky Walden in December, Wilson made his first maximum break in professional competition. He also performed successfully at the European Tour events, winning his first round matches at every tournament. The highlight was his first ever semi-final at the Rotterdam Open where he was leading eventual tournament winner Mark Williams 3–1 but lost 4–3. Thanks to these performances, Wilson finished 24th on the Order of Merit to qualify for the Finals, where he was whitewashed 4–0 by Fu. Wilson's season came to a disappointing end as he was beaten 10–4 by James Cahill in the opening round of World Championship qualifying. However, he had made enough money during the year to give up his taxi driver job and concentrate on playing snooker full-time in the future.

2014/2015
Wilson qualified for the 2014 Wuxi Classic, the opening ranking event of the season, where he lost 5–3 to Alan McManus in the first round.
He couldn't regain his momentum from last year as he failed to progress beyond the last 64 stage of any tournament in the first half of the season. Wilson's breakthrough came in February at the Welsh Open, as he defeated Zhang Anda, John Astley and Joe Perry. He then knocked out Neil Robertson 4–2 to reach his first major quarter-final, stating afterwards that he had proven that he could handle the big occasions. Wilson took an early 2–1 lead against Ben Woollaston, but lost four frames in a row to be beaten 5–2. In the opening round of the Indian Open, Wilson was edged out 4–3 by Adam Duffy.

At the China Open, Wilson eliminated Liang Wenbo 5–3, Ricky Walden 5–2 and Dechawat Poomjaeng 5–1 to play in his second ranking event quarter-final in under two months. Despite defeating Barry Hawkins 5–3, Wilson said that he was struggling with his game but hoped to find his form in the semi-finals against home favourite and reigning champion Ding Junhui. He fell 3–1 down, but moved 5–3 ahead with four breaks of 50 or above. Ding took the match into a deciding frame in which Wilson made a 72 to set up a meeting with reigning world champion Mark Selby in the final, in which Wilson was heavily beaten 10–2. Wilson said later that he didn't feel the occasion got to him, but simply missed the majority of chances that came his way and cued across the ball many times. His last match of the season was a 10–7 loss to Li Hang in the second round of World Championship qualifying. Wilson's successful year resulted in him increasing his ranking by 34 places in 12 months to end the season as 34th in the world.

2015/2016
Wilson could not build on last year's exploits during the 2015–16 season. He lost in the qualifiers for the first three ranking events. He beat Martin O'Donnell 6–3 at the UK Championship, before being defeated 6–4 by Martin Gould in the second round. Wilson reached the same stage of the Welsh Open, but lost 4–1 to Liang Wenbo. He qualified for the China Open, but he was knocked out 5–3 by Stephen Maguire in the opening round.

2016/2017
At the Indian Open, Wilson overcame Zhao Xintong 4–1 and Anthony Hamilton 4–2, but lost 4–2 to Akani Songsermsawad. His only last 16 appearance of the season so far came at the Northern Ireland Open, courtesy of knocking out Peter Lines 4–0, Andrew Higginson 4–3 and Sam Baird 4–3, before he was defeated 4–3 by Mark Allen. Wilson qualified for the China Open and beat Graeme Dott 5–3, but then was beaten 5–1 by Shaun Murphy.

Wilson successfully qualified for the 2017 World Championship. Making his second 147 in the fourth frame of his first round qualifier against Josh Boileau, he edged through 10–9. In the second qualifying round he defeated Peter Lines 10–7, then Michael White 10–3. In his three matches he made eight centuries, more than double that of any other player. He rated the achievement of qualifying bigger than reaching the final of the China Open in 2015. On his debut in the event he played Ronnie O'Sullivan, and rallied from 5–1 to be down only 5–4 after the first session. He fell 9–5 behind, before winning two frames in a row, but O'Sullivan then got the frame he needed to progress 10–7. Wilson made two century breaks during the match.

2017/2018
Wilson was a quarter-finalist at the 2017 Paul Hunter Classic, but lost 4–2 to Jamie Jones. In the second half of the season, he made it to the semi-finals of the 2018 Welsh Open, where he was defeated 6–2 by John Higgins.

2018/19
Early in the season, Wilson made two quarter-final appearances, at the non-ranking Haining Open, and right after that at the ranking World Open.

At the 2019 Snooker World Championship Wilson defeated Luca Brecel, Mark Selby and Ali Carter before losing 17–11 to eventual winner Judd Trump in the semi-finals.

2019/20 
Wilson reached a quarter- and a semi-final in both the first and the second half of the season. In August, in the quarter-final stage of the 2019 International Championship he faced Mark Selby, who narrowly knocked him out by the scoreline of 6–5. A month later, Wilson reached the semi-final of the 2019 Six-red World Championship, losing to Stephen Maguire 7–5. At the start of the next year, Wilson suffered another 6–5 defeat, this time by Zhou Yuelong, at the 2020 European Masters semi-final.  Next month he exited the 2020 World Grand Prix at the quarter-finals, losing to Tom Ford 5–2.

2020/21 
At the WST Pro Series, Wilson made his third career maximum break when he was playing against Liam Highfield in the group stage. This was the first maximum break in the history of the event.

2021/22 
Wilson was a runner-up to Mark Williams at the 2021 British Open, losing by the scoreline of 4–6. This was Wilson's second ranking final appearance.

At the 2021 UK Championship, he made his fourth maximum break in his first round match against Ian Burns.

2022/23: First ranking title
Wilson finally secured his first ranking title at the 2022 Scottish Open, defeating Joe O'Connor 9–2 in the final.

Performance and rankings timeline

Career finals

Ranking finals: 3 (1 title)

Non-ranking finals: 2 (1 title)

Team finals: 1

Amateur finals: 4 (3 titles)

References

External links

Gary Wilson at worldsnooker.com

1985 births
Living people
English snooker players
British taxi drivers
Sportspeople from Wallsend